The Verve Cup Regatta was established in 1992 and is organized annually by the Chicago Yacht Club. In 2010, it became the largest offshore course race regatta in North America. The Verve provides is one-of-a-kind regatta that is a highlight of the sailing season in the Midwest U.S. The event is sailed over three days and takes place on three racing circles in Lake Michigan with the Chicago skyline as a backdrop. The competition includes offshore and inshore courses, as well as a new distance race added in 2010.

As one of the only major offshore regattas held in the U.S. during the month of August, the Verve Cup has developed as a world-class event, attracting national and international sailing competitors. The Verve annually attracts 250–300 yachts to Chicago’s Chicago lake front with size ranging from 25 feet up to 80 feet in length with sailing crews from 4 to 20 persons. The 2011 race is scheduled for August 18 – 21, which coincides with Chicago’s spectacular Air & Water Show.

Competitors participate in multiple races, and boats sail either with a rating handicap or a one design so that boats of different size and character can compete against one another in one of the 18 plus racing sections. Overall prizes are awarded to the top finishers in each section, with one offshore boat winning the perpetual Verve Cup Trophy. The Verve Cup trophy dates from the late 19th century and is Chicago Yacht Club’s oldest sterling silver trophy. Overall prizes are awarded for each class of sailboat. Participants are treated to three days of top–quality racing, followed by food, entertainment and camaraderie making the Verve Cup a favorite competition. The regatta is organized by a volunteer committee who are committed to the tradition and passion of the sport of sailing.

The Verve Cup series also includes the most popular inshore regatta in Chicago held on the following weekend in August. Identical One-Design classes compete for two days to determine which boat has the best skipper and crew. A range of fleets compete including Etchells, Shields, Luders 16, Rhodes 19, Solings, and J-24 keelboat classes, as the race requires just five boats to be registered in a class to participate, so fleets are mobilized for racing.

The Winner's Trophy
In the spring of 1884, the "Scotch cutter" Verve was brought to Chicago by Commodore E.W. Ayer. She had been built by G.L. Watson on the River Clyde in Scotland, an area famous for its contribution to yachting and the home of many notable designers and yachtbuilders. The Verve was already a champion upon arrival to the Great Lakes as she "won 16 races in the last yar". She was a typical plank-on-edge cutter of the time; 45 feet overall, 38.7 feet on the water, a 7.6 foot draft, a 3.0 foot freeboard, and 6 feet of headroom in the cabin. On July 12, 1884, in the Annual Regatta of the Chicago Yacht Club she won the "second" (smaller) class and beat all of the boats in the first class on corrected time. Her prize was "a silver cup, value $125". This cup was returned to the Chicago Yacht Club in 1964 and placed in service when a two-day regatta for the Offshore Fleet commenced in 1992.

The 2011 winner of the Verve Cup Trophy was Winnebago, a T-10 skippered by Tim Rathbun of Joliet, IL.

Roster of Verve Cup winners

2011 Race Results
Offshore Regatta 

Inshore Regatta

External links 
  www.chicagoyachtclub.org
  www.ussailing.org

References 

Sailing competitions in the United States
Yachting races
Chicago Yacht Club